Joseph City (elevation 5,000 ft) is a Census Designated Place located in Navajo County, Arizona, United States.  It is located on Interstate 40, approximately eighty miles east of Flagstaff and about thirty-five miles west of Petrified Forest National Park.  In 2010, there were 1,386 inhabitants.

It is the site of the Jack Rabbit Trading Post, a famous Route 66 landmark.

History
Joseph City was settled in 1876 by colonists who were members of the Church of Jesus Christ of Latter-day Saints.  This band of 73 pioneers was led by Captain William C. Allen.  They traveled to the 
Little Colorado River basin of Arizona. Joseph City was one of four Little Colorado River colonies.  The other colonies were Brigham City, Sunset, and Obed. Joseph City is the only remaining colony.

The hardest challenge for the new colonists was trying to get water for their crops. This meant that they had to tame the Little Colorado River, which was difficult due to the flooding season that would destroy dams along the river. The first dam was built in 1876, shortly after the colonists arrived in the area. In the next 18 years the colonists built ten more dams. The eleventh dam was built in 1894. This dam lasted 29 years. In 1923, the eleventh dam was destroyed and the colonists were forced to build a new dam. This dam still currently stands and directs water to the inhabitants still in the city.

The name of the colony changed twice since its founding. The area settled by Captain Allen's group was called Allen's Camp, in honor of their leader. The name changed in January 1878 to St. Joseph.  This change came about when the Little Colorado Stake was organized, to honor Joseph Smith, founder of the Latter Day Saint movement. In 1923 there was a final name change to Joseph City. Due to mail and freight shipment confusion, the Santa Fe Railway, which also ran through Saint Joseph, Missouri, asked St. Joseph, Arizona to change its name.  The residents of the town voted and the name became Joseph City.

Geography
Joseph City is located at  (34.955833, -110.333889).

Demographics

Climate

Joseph City has a semi-arid climate (BSk) with cold to cool winters and hot summers.

Education
Joseph City is served by the Joseph City Unified School District. Two schools, Joseph City Elementary School, and Joseph City High School, serve the community. Their schools have a very high AIMS standard. The current Superintendent of Joseph City Unified School District is Bryan Fields.

Economy
The Cholla Power Plant is located near Joseph City.

Images of Joseph City

Pictured are the following:

 The Historic St. Joseph City Bridge (Obed Bridge) was built in 1912 over the Little Colorado River and located on Obed Road. It was listed in the National Register of Historic Places listed on September 30, 1988, ref.: #88001633,
 Ella's Frontier Store and warehouse located on Main Street between 3rd. Street and O’Connell Lane. The structure was built in 1927 out of telephone poles.
 Historic Marker and ruins on Main Street which indicates where the Mormon Old Fort was once located.
 The Jackrabbit Trading Post was established  in 1949 and is located on Route 66.

See also
 Little Colorado River
 The Church of Jesus Christ of Latter-day Saints in Arizona

References

External links
 
 

Unincorporated communities in Navajo County, Arizona
U.S. Route 66 in Arizona
Populated places established in 1876
Unincorporated communities in Arizona
1876 establishments in Arizona Territory